The Francois Lake Group is a stratigraphical unit of the Nechako Plateau in the central Interior of British Columbia, Canada.

See also
Buck Creek basin

References

Stratigraphy of British Columbia